Mesonyx ("middle claw") is a genus of extinct mesonychid mesonychian mammal: fossils of the various species are found in Early to Late Eocene-age strata in the United States and Early Eocene-aged strata in China, 51.8—51.7 Ma (AEO).

While this was the earliest genus of mesonychid to be named (by Edward Drinker Cope in 1872) and the group is named after it, Mesonyx was one of the most derived genera of mesonychids, evolving features for active running. These animals had a reduced sense of smell and likely relied on sight and hearing to find food. They were probably active hunters. Mesonyx species have been estimated as 1.25-1.5m (4.5–5 ft.) long in life, not including the tail. Weight estimates vary, from 20 to 55 kg (about 45-120 lbs). Like other mesonychids, the toes ended in small hooves. The long skull had a relatively large sagittal crest above the braincase to anchor large jaw muscles and give it a powerful bite. Brain casts show that M. obtusidens had an unusually well-developed neocortex for an Eocene mammal. Though modern Carnivora have more complex brains, their ancestors did not; Mesonyx species would have been intelligent animals for their time.

Mesonyx specimens have been unearthed in Colorado, Wyoming, Utah and China. Like other mesonychids, they have large heads and long necks in proportion to their body size, and cranial material is most often preserved. Mesonyx uintensis from the Upper Eocene of Wyoming is described as having a total cranium length of 429 mm. (17 inches) and a facial length of 206 mm (8 inches). Another specimen of Mesonyx uintensis is known from the Upper Eocene of northern Utah. An additional two species – Mesonyx uqbulakensis and M. nuhetingensis – have been described from the early Eocene Arshanto Formation in China.

Size estimates of Mesonyx were used to generate the often-quoted idea that Andrewsarchus was the largest predatory land mammal that ever lived. Since Andrewsarchus is known only from a single isolated skull, the estimate of its size was based on scaling up material from Mesonyx. However, it is now known that the two genera are not closely related, their skulls indicate different lifestyles, and they likely had very different proportions in life.

Phylogeny

In the generally accepted cladogram by Spaulding et al. (2009), Mesonyx is classified, together with other mesonychians, outside of ungulates.

References

Mesonychids
Eocene mammals of Asia
Eocene mammals of North America
Eocene United States
Eocene genus first appearances
Eocene genus extinctions
Fossil taxa described in 1872
Prehistoric placental genera
Taxa named by Edward Drinker Cope